The 2007 Nigerian Senate election in Imo State was held on 21 April 2007, to elect members of the Nigerian Senate to represent Imo State. Chris Anyanwu representing Imo East, Osita Izunaso representing Imo West and Sylvester Anyanwu representing Imo North all won on the platform of the People's Democratic Party.

Overview

Summary

Results

Imo East 
The election was won by Chris Anyanwu of the Peoples Democratic Party (Nigeria).

Imo West 
The election was won by Osita Izunaso of the Peoples Democratic Party (Nigeria).

Imo North
The election was won by Sylvester Anyanwu of the Peoples Democratic Party (Nigeria).

References 

April 2007 events in Nigeria
Imo State Senate elections
Imo